Count Otto of Duras (d. 1147) was a Count of Duras, and advocatus of the Abbey of St Truiden. Duras and St Truiden are in the modern province of Belgian Limburg. His parents were Count Giselbert of Duras and his wife Gertrud.

Otto married Berthe of Valenciennes, daughter of Yolande of Guelders, daughter of Gerard I, Count of Guelders.  Yolande was first married to Baldwin III, Count of Hainaut, and was mother to Baldwin IV, Count of Hainaut.  Yolande was granddaughter of Albert III, Count of Namur, a family with strong relations with Otto’s father.

Otto and Berthe are thought to have had one child who survived to adulthood, Otto's successor:
 Juliane (d. 1164), married first Godfried, Count of Montaigu, Duras and Clermont, and second Enguerrand, possibly the count of Orbais.

In Sint-Truiden charter 51 (Piot Vol.2) Countess Juliane was described as Otto's filia, and her Juliane's husband Count Godfried was described as his gener. This could mean "son-in-law" or "brother-in-law". (In the 19th century Wolters for example identified Juliane as Otto's sister, but this seems unlikely given the succession of the Counts of Duras.)

Juliane and Godfried had five children, the eldest of which was Gilles, Count of Montaigu, Duras, and Clermont, who married Lauretta, daughter of Louis I, Count of Loon. Their third son Conan was also Count of Duras. None of Juliane's sons had male heirs, and the family inheritance split up after their deaths.

Sources 

Baerten, Jean, ‘Les origines des comtes de Looz et la formation territoriale du comté’, in: Revue belge de philologie et d'histoire 43 (2 parts; 1965) 459-491, 1217-1242. On persee: part 1, part 2.
Baerten, Jean, Het Graafschap Loon (11de - 14de eeuw), (Assen 1969).  pdf
Hanon de Louvet (1941) Histoire de la Ville de Jodoigne
Piot, Cartulaire de l'abbaye de Saint-Trond, Vol.2. https://archive.org/details/cartulairedelabb01sainuoft/
C. G. Roland, Les seigneurs et comtes de Rochefort, Annales de la Société archéologique de Namur 20 (1893) https://archive.org/details/annalesdelasocie20soci/page/63
Ulens, R., "Les origines et les limites primitives du comté de Duras" Bulletin de la Société Scientifique & littéraire du Limbourg 50 (1936) pp.49-71.
Vaes, Jan, De Graven van Loon. Loons, Luiks, Limburgs (Leuven 2016)
Wolters, Mathias J., Notice Historique sur l’Ancien Comté de Duras en Hesbaie, Gyselinck, 1855 (available on Google Books)
Zeller, Thibaut, "La maison de Durras en Hesbaye : les pilliers de pouvoir d’une parentèle comtale (XIe -XIIe  siècles)", l'Annuaire d'histoire liégeoise, 37, (2007-2008), pp.33-57.

Primary sources
Gestorum Abbatem Trudonensium Continuatio Tertia: Koepker (ed.) MGH SS Vol.10 dmgh.de; =de Borman (ed.) Vol.1 Vol.2; =Lavigne (trans.) 228-229 (pdf).

External links
Medieval Lands Project, Comtes de Duras

European nobility